The Sham Liberation Army, originally called the Sham Liberation Brigade, is an armed rebel group active in the Syrian Civil War. It was founded and is led by Firas Bitar, a captain who defected from the Syrian Arab Army in 2012. Until 2016, its sole opponent was the Syrian Armed Forces and its allied militias; it rejected any fighting with the Islamic State of Iraq and the Levant until ISIL attacked its fighters in February 2016.

In September 2015, the Sham Liberation Army and other rebel groups in the Qalamoun Mountains formed Saraya Ahl al-Sham (Company of the People of the Levant).

History

In November 2014, Colonel Abdullah al-Rifai of the 11th Special Forces Division of Saraya Ahl al-Sham was arrested by the Lebanese Armed Forces near Arsal. He was detained by the General Directorate of General Security and released on 2 January 2015. On 14 August, he was assassinated in Arsal.

On 30 September 2015, Sham Liberation Army, along with 12 other FSA and Islamist rebel factions, formed Saraya Ahl al-Sham in the western Qalamoun Mountains. The group maintained "good" relations with al-Qaeda's al-Nusra Front and other groups in the former Army of Conquest's Qalamoun branch.

In February 2016, the SLA along with eh Saraya Ahl al-Sham rejected the inter-rebel conflict during the Syrian Civil War against the Islamic State of Iraq and the Levant, remaining neutral in the conflict and stating that its only opponent is the Syrian government. However, during the eastern Qalamoun offensive (September—October 2016), the group joined with the other rebels in fighting ISIL.

In February 2017, negotiations between Saraya Ahl al-Sham and Hezbollah began in order to install a ceasefire and for residents to return to the contest towns and villages between Hezbollah and the rebels.

On 27 May 2017, Tahrir al-Sham and Saraya Ahl al-Sham clashed with the Islamic State of Iraq and the Levant in the western Qalamoun Mountains near Arsal. 33 fighters were killed from both sides.

On 27 July 2017, a ceasefire agreement was reached by Hezbollah with Tahrir al-Sham and Saraya Ahl al-Sham in the Lebanese portion of the Qalamoun Mountains. The agreement called for Tahrir al-Sham forces to withdraw from Lebanon to Idlib, Saraya Ahl al-Sham forces to withdraw to the eastern Qalamoun Mountains, where opposition forces maintain a pocket of control, and exchanges of prisoners from both sides.

On 14 August 2017, the last 400 fighters of Saraya Ahl al-Sham coalition and their families departed the Lebanon–Syria border and headed to the eastern Qalamoun Mountains.

In April 2018, the SLA, along with the rest of Saraya Ahl al-Sham evacuated to Afrin.

On 7 April 2018, the group published a statement condemning the Syrian Government, the Russian intervention and Hezbollah involvement in the war and requested that the United Nations send in military forces to intervene.

Saraya Ahl Al-Sham Member groups
Western Qalamoun Union
Levant Liberation Division
 Levant Liberation Brigade (Sham Liberation Army)
 Sadik Unit
 Martyr Mohammed Qassem Brigade
al-Ghouta Martyrs Battalion
Omar Haider Brigade
11th Special Forces Division (formerly part of the Southern Front)
Itasimou Bihabl al-Lah Rally
al-Ghurabaa Brigade
The Men from Qalamoun Brigade
Western Qalamoun Rally
Martyrs of Qastal Brigade
Dira al-Qalamoun Battalion
Martyrs of Nabek Battalion
 Ibn Taymiyyah Battalion

See also
List of armed groups in the Syrian Civil War

References

Anti-government factions of the Syrian civil war
Anti-ISIL factions in Syria
Free Syrian Army
Military units and formations established in 2015
Military units and formations disestablished in 2018
Turkish supported militant groups of the Syrian civil war